Manduca jasminearum, the ash sphinx, is a member of the moth family Sphingidae. It ranges from east of the Mississippi River to the Atlantic Ocean, being common in the northeast United States.

The wingspan is 84–105 mm. There are two generations per year with adults on wing from May to September. They nectar at flowers.

The larva of this species mainly feed on ash species (Fraxinus), but have also been recorded feeding on Syringa and Ulmus species.

References

Manduca
Moths described in 1832